Incentivisation (British spelling) or incentivization (American spelling) is the practice of building incentives into an arrangement or system in order to motivate the actors within it. It is based on the idea that individuals within such systems can perform better not only when they are coerced but also when they are given rewards.

Concept 
Incentivisation aims to motivate rather than encourage enthusiasm so that individuals perform better. It is distinguished from a bribery system in the sense that it provides the "spark to motivate, stimulate, move, arouse, and encourage workers to strive for a personal best." As a result of this motivation, it is proposed that incentivisation can improve the efficiency of different systems. This is supported by the theory that individuals react in response to extrinsic motivators, in other words, rewards such as increased pay or avoiding punishment such as disciplinary action. This is different to intrinsic motivators, which are based on self-interest and are exempt from external pressure. For example, Wikipedia editors have an intrinsic incentive to contribute to the website as there is no financial reward but instead altruism, recognition, and reciprocity.

There are different types of incentives that should be accounted for in incentivisation strategies. Economic incentives account for the material gains or losses, whereas social incentives account for reputational gains or losses. It is important to understand which type of incentive motivates the target group of an incentivisation strategy. For instance, exposure to extrinsic monetary incentives may counteract other incentives/motivations and lead to less overall interest in the task. In cases like this, incentivisation actually backfires. 

An incentivisation strategy can leverage an existing system of measures to address interrelated issues such as those involving risk, cost, and performance if done correctly. This can be adopted in multiple fields.

Biological Psychology of Incentivisation 
An individual's response to incentivization appears to be controlled by the ventromedial prefrontal cortex. The brain can express a decreased response to incentivization after experiencing damage to or near the nucleus accumbens. However, people may become more sensitive to incentives when there is damage to the subgenual ventromedial prefrontal cortex.

Behavioural Economics of Incentivisation 
Behavioral economics highlights that humans have two cognitive systems. One is automatic and the other is reflective. The reflective system is seen as more rational and/or cognitive. It is more controlled, effortful, rule-following, self-aware and deductive. The reflective system allows us to analyse available information as well as the incentives offered to us to act in their best interests. This contrasts with the automatic system, that takes short-cuts, uses heuristics, and biases. The two systems are also commonly referred to as the 'Fast and Slow' systems of thinking, with the reflective being ‘slow’ and the automatic being ‘fast’. Incentives change behaviour by changing people’s minds. Once the possible rewards are highlighted, the reflective system weighs up the revised costs and benefits of our actions and responds accordingly.

The Effectiveness of Incentivisation 
These factors should be considered when devising or analysing an incentivisation strategy.

Framing 
How an incentive is presented and framed is important. This is known as the choice context and is commonly referred to as the choice architecture. For instance, if in a given context, information is low about how fun a specific task is, by offering a respective amount to complete the task, people might think that the task is unenjoyable and this incentive would fail.

Loss Aversion 
We dislike losses more than we like gains of the same value. Individuals respond more strongly to losing something they value than being given a reward of equivalent value. This is known as loss aversion. A weight loss programme asked some participants to deposit money that would be returned to them if targets were met- those that did this lost significantly more weight than those who did not.

Human's Mental Budgeting 
The importance of context is enhanced as people understand the monetary value of categories (salary, savings, expenses) differently. The same extrinsic incentives create different responses in people, depending on how they understand, value and organise their money.

Type and Size of Incentives 
The impact also depends on type and size of the incentives. In terms of size- paying a high reward on the successful completion of a task could make the participant anxious about completing the task and reduce their ability to do so. The concept section discusses that economic incentives must be matched with suitable tasks and audiences.

Timing and Frequency of Incentives 
In terms of timing- the value of rewards may change over time and in different situations, meaning the value of an incentive can too. The frequency of incentives is also important and can impact the effectiveness of incentivisation. Changes in behaviour may reverse back to their original form if one-off incentives are used. This is because they can condition us to behave in the new way only if we are rewarded. If the rewards stop, the new behaviour can also stop.

Incentivisation tends to be more effective at forming permanent habits if they only reward us sometimes. On this note, incentivisation can be likened to operant conditioning, the association of a voluntary behaviour with a consequence. Take the example of someone receiving pocket money. When this money is given at a set specific time, every week for example, or is guaranteed every time a behaviour is expressed, it becomes expected. If money is given only sometimes when the behaviour is expressed, the individual is unsure whether they will receive a reward, which makes performing the behaviour more exciting- like gambling. This is why incentivisation can be more effective when rewards are random.

Overemphasis of Small Probabilities 
People overemphasise small probabilities which means incentives may be skewed and based upon unrealistic expectations.

Payoff Timing 
We prefer immediate payoffs rather than distant ones, even if the immediate payoffs are smaller than the distant ones. People would rather avoid the short-term pain of diabetes blood test rather than the long-term health gain.

Examples

Incentivisation in Public Policy 
Incentives are used across the world in local and central government as mechanisms to motivate behaviour change.

A simple example of negative incentivisation would be taxing people at 98% on all investment income, which happened in the UK in the 1970s (for the extremely rich). This level of taxation gives individuals an incentive not to invest.  This has the effects that:
 People might stop investing
 Taxes might stop being paid (due to people no longer investing)
 The economy might behave poorly (due to lack of investment)

Another example of this is the driving behaviours of bus drivers in South America. They have been shown to exhibit numerous dangerous behaviours that put the children at risk, and incentivisation was used to successfully lower the level of dangerous driving behaviours.

Another example is the Danish gyms programme, where membership was free unless members failed to show up once per week, in which case they would be billed a monthly membership.

The Behavioural Insights Team - UK 
Nudge theory argues that indirect suggestions to try to achieve non-forced compliance can influence the incentives of individuals. The UK has a specific Behavioural Insights Team, also known as the ‘nudge unit’, for the purposes of influencing behaviour in this way. An example of their work is Transport for London’s ‘Step2Get’ initiative, in which students were nudged to walk to school by swiping cards along lamp-posts on their walking route which earned them points that could be redeemed as Topshop vouchers and cinema tickets. It increased the number of children walking to school by 18%.

See also 

 Reward system

References

Motivation